Giovanni Battista Averara (1508 – November 10, 1548) was an Italian painter of the Renaissance period. He was born in Bergamo. Little is known of this landscape painter who died at a young age from a dog bite. He painted in the style of Titian. He is mentioned by the biographer Tassi, and may be confused with Giovanni Battista de Averara.

References

1508 births
1548 deaths
16th-century Italian painters
Italian male painters
Painters from Bergamo
Italian Renaissance painters